Comte. Rolim Adolfo Amaro State Airport  is the airport serving Jundiaí, Brazil. It is named after Rolim Adolfo Amaro (1942–2001), founder and former president of LATAM Brasil formerly known as TAM Airlines.

It is operated by Rede Voa.

History
The airport was commissioned in 1942 and it is dedicated to general aviation. In 2009 the airport was ranked 10th in terms of aircraft operations in Brazil, and in 2010 it remained amongst the busiest airports in the country due to its general aviation traffic, including executive aviation and aircraft maintenance facilities.

On 15 March 2017 Voa São Paulo was granted by the government of the State of São Paulo the concession to operate this facility, previously operated by DAESP.

Azul Conecta has its main maintenance base at the airport.

Airlines and destinations

Access

See also

List of airports in Brazil

References

External links

Airports in São Paulo (state)
Airports established in 1942
1942 establishments in Brazil